Dnyaneshwar Dnyan Mandir English High School, Thane was established in the year 1975, and in 2010, the new management of Goodwill International Foundation Trust (GIFT) took over the school. The President of the Trust and Board of Governors is Mrs. Nandini R. Vichare. Now GIFT runs a Nursery, Pre Primary, Primary School, High School and Junior College of Science and Commerce with General and Bifocal stream. Goodwill International Foundation School and Jr. College is affiliated to Mumbai Divisional board of Secondary and Higher Secondary Education.

School profile
Dnyaneshwar Dnyan Mandir High School And Junior College has approximately 13 teachers. Out of the total number of teachers, 10 are Upper Primary School teachers, and 3 are Secondary School teachers. The school has a pass percentage of 83.33% in Tenth Standard board examination. The boys' pass percentage in Tenth Standard board examination is 66.67%. The girls' pass percentage in Tenth Standard board examination is 100%.

Courses offered
Stream Options for Courses for High School /Junior College: 
 Commerce
 Science
Courses for High School /Junior College:
 Commerce General
 Commerce Bifocal Banking
 Commerce Bifocal Office Management
 Science Bifocal Computer Science
 Science General

Location
The school is located besides Kumbla Hospital in Charai.

References

Schools in Thane district